Rhyacia ledereri is a moth of the family Noctuidae. It is found in the southern Urals, from central Asia to southern Siberia to the Amur region and in Mongolia, China, Tibet and northern India.

External links
Noctuinae (Noctuidae) collection of Siberian Zoological Museum
Fauna Europaea

Noctuinae